The Lola THL2 was a Formula One racing car designed by Neil Oatley for FORCE and was used by Team Haas (USA) Ltd. during the 1986 Formula One season. Two of the FORCE aerodynamicists who worked on the car during its countless hours of Wind tunnel testing were a young Ross Brawn and Adrian Newey. The car debuted at the 1986 San Marino Grand Prix and was driven by  World Drivers' Champion Alan Jones from Australia, and his new teammate Patrick Tambay of France.

Jones, with 12 career wins in his first F1 career from 1975-81 (plus one race for Arrows in ), had been with the team since its debut at the 1985 Italian Grand Prix. Tambay joined after two seasons driving for the factory Renault team, and a season and a half with Ferrari before that.

The car was an evolution of the Lola THL1 which used the Hart 415T Straight 4 turbo. Continued development and testing meant that the engine started to become more competitive for the following season in 1987, but by the time this engine had made its debut in 1986, it was only a year between when Duckworth and Goddard started designing the engine to its first race; this is a very short time for a Formula One racing engine to be produced. They were behind after some initial tests to turbocharge Goddard's old 4-cylinder engine used in sportscars and lower formulae proved to be a failure (Duckworth had wanted to use the 4 cyl as he believed they were more economical and compact than a V6, but Goddard was never happy with the idea); and it was only towards the end of 1984 where funding was agreed to design the whole new V6. This led to a frustrating season for both Jones and Tambay as the THL2 was generally regarded to be the best handling car of the season. Jones and Tambay were reported to have continually asked Duckworth to build special qualifying engines with more power like Renault, BMW and Honda were doing in order to be able to qualify the car further up the grid, but the requests were turned down. Duckworth, Ford and Cosworth all believed that their proven reliability record would hold them in good stead against their sometimes fragile opposition.

Jones only scored 4 points during the season and retired from F1 for good at season's end. Tambay only scored two points with 5th place in Austria. Tambay also departed F1 at season's end, as did the Lola Haas team following the withdrawal of their major sponsor Beatrice Foods. The THL2s best qualifying position was 6th by Tambay at the Hungaroring for the 1986 Hungarian Grand Prix where the tight nature of the circuit meant a good handling car was more important than outright power.

Like its predecessor, the car was called a Lola but its only connection to the famous Lola Cars was because of car owner Carl Haas's previous close association with Lola founder Eric Broadley, who was also named as chief engineer for the team in 1985.

Complete Formula One results
(key)

References

1986 Formula One season cars
THL2